Thomas James Jagodowski (born September 2, 1971) is an American comedian, actor, and improvisational performer who resides in Chicago. He has been a member of The Second City as well as a performer and teacher at iO Theater, formerly known as "Improv Olympic". He has appeared in movies such as Stranger Than Fiction, The Ice Harvest, No Sleep Till Madison, Get Hard and the television show, Prison Break. He is most recognizable from the long-running series of improvised Sonic Drive-In commercials featuring himself and Peter Grosz until 2020.

Life and career
Jagodowski was born in Holyoke, Massachusetts. He attended Blessed Sacrament school and graduated as salutatorian of Holyoke Catholic High School in 1988.  While in college at Syracuse University, a vending machine fell on his leg, breaking multiple bones. He had plates and screws installed in his right leg, though a rampant staph infection took hold. Doctors told him he was one week away from losing the leg to gangrene. T. J. discussed this during a performance of "The Armando Diaz Theatrical Experience and Hootenanny", a weekly show at iO that uses one performer's/guest monologist's stories as inspiration for improvised scenes. T. J. 
was the monologist that evening and noted while telling the story that he generally hates when other monologists tell "these kinds of stories".

Jagodowski began improvising in the early 90s. He started out on several Harold teams at iO Chicago. In 1998, he was cast in the Mainstage cast of The Second City, where he appeared in revues on both Mainstage and e.t.c. stages alongside Kevin Dorff, Susan Messing, Stephnie Weir, and many others. Since 2002, he has been performing at iO with David Pasquesi in the long-running improv show "TJ & Dave."

The 2009 South by Southwest Film festival included the documentary "Trust Us, This is All Made Up" directed by Alex Karpovsky, which chronicles a "T. J. and Dave" performance.

The Chicago Improv Festival called Jagodowski "The best improviser in Chicago". New City Chicago said, "If Miles Davis had pursued comedy instead of music, the results might have looked something like this." Jagodowski performs weekly in Chicago in a variety of improv programs, but most notably in "T. J. and Dave" with David Pasquesi, which the Chicago Reader has described as "an hour of subtle character development, verbal facility, and pantomimic agility that anticipates and plays off the audience's reactions." Since 2006, the duo performs this show monthly at The Barrow Street Theatre in New York City, and have been performing the show weekly since 2002 in Chicago.

From 2002 to 2012 and 2014 on, Jagodowski has starred as one half of the "Two Guys" for the Sonic Drive-In commercials alongside fellow improviser Peter Grosz. In 2020, it was reported that Sonic's commercials would be going in a different directions, but that the "Two Guys" series would continue to be part of the chain's advertising in some way. Lori Abou Habib, Sonic's Chief Marketing Officer, said that the commercials are "a huge part of our voice, and they’ll be part of our brand going forward."  The two actors also appeared together in the 2006 film Stranger Than Fiction.

Jagodowski was a guest on the NPR program Wait Wait... Don't Tell Me! on the weekend of November 2–3, 2013.

In 2019, the Holyoke St. Patrick's Day Parade Committee honored Jagodowski with the John Fitzgerald Kennedy National Award. The John F. Kennedy Award is presented annually to an American of Irish descent who has distinguished themselves in their chosen field. Past winners included Jimmy Breslin, Doris Kearns Goodwin, Tom Clancy, David McCullough, Leo Edward O'Neil, Art Rooney, Dan Devine, Tip O'Neill, Dennis Day, Neil Sheehan, as well as John F. Kennedy and Ted Kennedy.

Filmography

Film

Television

References

External links

Radio Interview with T. J.
Interview with T. J.

1971 births
Male actors from Massachusetts
Living people
People from Holyoke, Massachusetts
S.I. Newhouse School of Public Communications alumni